Once in a Red Moon (released 2001 by Universal Music – 548 678-2) is the fourth studio album by Secret Garden, excluding the compilation album Dreamcatcher, a Best Of.

The second track, "You Raise Me Up", has since been recorded by more than 100 other artists. The first track, "Awakening", was inspired by the 1899 novel of the same name by Kate Chopin.

Track listing

Reception 
Allmusic reviewer Jonathan Widran awarded the album 4.5 stars.

Guest Performers 
 Guest performers on the second track, "You Raise Me Up", include Brian Kennedy (vocal), Liam O'Flynn (uilleann pipes and tin whistle), the London Community Gospel Choir, and Irish choral group Anúna.
 The vocalist on track 4, "Greenwaves", is Karen Matheson, lead singer of Scottish band Capercaillie.
 Julian Lloyd Webber plays cello on track 6, "Duo". 
 Track 8, "Gates of Dawn", features vocals by Karen Matheson and choral backing by Anúna, who also perform on track 12 "Elegie".

Personnel 
Violin – Fionnuala Sherry
Keyboards, harmonium & piano – Rolf Løvland (tracks: 1-3, 9 & 11)
Piano, harmonium, keyboards & organ – Bjørn Ole Rasch (tracks: 2, 5, 8, 10)
Piano (global C) – Bjørn Ole Rasch, Einar Sogstad & Trond Tellefsen (track: 12)
Bass – Per Elias Drabløs (tracks: 3-5, 7, 8, 10 & 12)
Percussion – Noel Eccles (tracks: 3-5, 7, 8, 10 & 12)
Bagpipes (Uilleann pipes) – Mick O'Brien (tracks: 4 & 5)
Bagpipes (Uilleann pipes) & tin whistle – Liam O'Flynn (track: 2)
Cello – Julian Lloyd Webber (track: 6)
Choir – Anúna (tracks: 2, 8, 12) & London Community Gospel Choir (track: 2)
Clarinet – John Finucane (track: 11)
Oboe – Simon Emes (tracks: 4-5, 7, 8, 10 & 12)
Oboe, Cor Anglais – Simon Emes (track: 3)
Guitar – Des Moore (tracks: 4, 7, 11 & 12)
Guitar – Steve Cooney (tracks: 5, 8 & 10)
Harmonium & keyboards – Kjetil Bjerkestrand (tracks: 4, 7 & 12)
Harp – Andrea Marlish (track: 3)
Concert harp – Andrea Marlish (track: 4)
Irish harp – Laoise Kelly (tracks: 7, 10, 12)
Nyckelharpa (Keyharp) – Åsa Jinder (tracks: 1, 5, 7-8, 10 & 12)
Keyboards – Kjetil Bjerkestrand (tracks: 3 & 11)
Mandolin & guitar – Des Moore (track: 3)
Whistle – Hans Fredrik Jacobsen (tracks: 3-5, 7-8, 10 & 12), Mick O'Brien (track: 5)
Willow flute – Hans Fredrik Jacobsen (tracks: 1)
Zither – Rolf Kristensen (tracks: 4 & 7)
Backing Vocals – Marian Lisland, Per Øystein Sørensen & Rolf Løvland (tracks: 4 & 8)
Leader [Gospel Choir Principal] – Bazil Meade (track: 2)
Leader [Orchestra] – Elaine Clark (tracks: 1-2, 6, 9, 11) & Threse Timoney (tracks: 3-5, 7-8, 10 & 12)
Members of Orchestra – Irish National Symphony Orchestra, RTÉ Concert Orchestra
Anúna direction – Michael McGlynn (tracks: 2, 8 & 12)

Credits 
Choir organised coordinator by Yvonne White
Orchestra organised coordinator by Tommy Kane
Cover design & booklet – Anne-C. Holm, Sigrid Therese Pfanzelter
Assistant engineer (Dublin) – Quentin Guiné
Assistant engineer (London) – Jake Jackson, Ricky Graham (2)
Mastering – Bjørn Engelmann
Other (hair) – Benedikte Hansen
Other (stylist / costumes) – Hilde Ottem Berntsen
Photographer – Nancy Bundt
Assistant photographer – Nina Reistad
Studio snapshots – Secret Garden
Producer – Fionnuala Sherry
Producer, composer & arranger – Rolf Lovland
Recording (Glasgow) – Kim Plannert
Recording (Kristiansand) – Alf Emil Eik
Recording (Oslo) – Trond Engebretsen
Recording, mixing & Co-producer – Andrew Boland

Notes 
Recorded, mixed an co-produced at Windmill Lane Studios, Dublin, Ireland.
Additional recording: 
Cross studio, Kristiansand, Norway 
Ambience studios, Oslo, Norway 
Secret Studio, Glasgow, Scotland 
Air Studio / Lindhurst Hall, London, UK.
Mastering at Cutting Room, Stockholm, Sweden 
Cover design and booklet at Virtual Garden
Julian Lloyd Webber (Track 6) appears courtesy of Decca Music Group. 
Karen Matheson (Tracks 4 & 8) appears courtesy of Capercaillie and Vertical Records.
'Global C' (Track 12) is a contribution of 66 piano players recorded and mixed together into the final chord.
℗ & © 2002 Universal Music AS, Norway

Charts

References

2002 albums
Secret Garden (duo) albums